USS Farragut (DDG-99) is an  in the United States Navy. She is the fifth Navy ship named for Admiral David Farragut (1801–1870), and the 49th ship of the Arleigh Burke class.

Farragut keel was laid down on 9 January 2004 at the Bath Iron Works in Bath, Maine. She was christened on 23 July 2005, with Senator Susan Collins of Maine as her sponsor. Farragut was commissioned on 10 June 2006 in Mayport, Florida.

Farragut is equipped with the "Smart Ship" data distribution and control system.

Deployments and ship history

Farragut departed Naval Station Mayport for her maiden deployment on 7 April 2008 in support of the Partnership of the Americas 2008 (POA 08). She returned home after six months on 5 October 2008.

Farragut departed Naval Station Mayport again in January 2010 for her second deployment, heading for the CENTCOM Area of Responsibility (AOR). After a quick transit through the Mediterranean Sea, she made her way south through the Suez Canal and into the Red Sea en route Djibouti, Djibouti to embark and become the flagship for Combined Task Force 151, the task force responsible for Counter-Piracy in the Gulf of Aden and Indian Ocean. Farragut then enjoyed a port visit to Port Victoria, Seychelles. Once complete with all tasking in CENTCOM, Farragut sailed back west through the Red Sea and the Mediterranean Sea to enjoy port visits in Santander, Spain and Lisbon, Portugal, before returning home to Naval Station Mayport in August 2010.

Farragut departed Naval Station Mayport once more in June 2012 for her third and latest deployment, to be spent in the Northern Atlantic Ocean, Mediterranean Sea, and CENTCOM AOR. Her first port visit was to Port Mahon, Menorca where the officers and crew visited the Admiral David Farragut Memorial and participated in a ceremony honoring the ship's namesake. From there the ship traveled to Riga, Latvia; Tallinn, Estonia; Bodø, Norway; Severomorsk, Russia; Wilhelmshaven, Germany; and La Rochelle, France. During these port visits, Farragut welcomed over 50 foreign dignitaries on board for seven receptions, crew members provided numerous ship tours to hundreds of visitors, and Sailors took part in ten community relations projects. While in 6th Fleet, Farragut participated in exercises with the French, Italian, Norwegian, and Russian navies.  She also embarked 15 foreign midshipmen and naval officers from Bulgaria, Georgia, Greece, Lithuania, and Sweden.  When Farragut crossed the Arctic Circle on the way to her port visit in Russia, crew members participated in a very chilly, but memorable, Blue Nose ceremony on board.  In the fall of 2012, Farragut transitioned to the 5th Fleet AOR and served with both the Dwight D. Eisenhower Carrier Strike Group and the  Carrier Strike Groups. Farragut again served as the Combined Task Force (CTF) 151 flagship and embarked 17 Officers and Sailors for 3 months.  As the CTF 151 flagship, Farragut was responsible for providing maritime security against piracy and securing freedom of navigation to vessels in the Gulf of Oman, Gulf of Aden and Somali Basin. While serving in the 5th Fleet, Farragut made port visits to Manama, Bahrain; Jebel Ali, UAE; and Muscat, Oman.  She also completed naval exercises with the Saudi Arabian, Russian, and Australian navies.  In November 2012, Farragut participated in joint exercises in the Persian Gulf during which she embarked the Combined Task Force 55 staff and provided vital inputs to the development of new surface warfare tactics.  Farraguts visit, board, search and seizure (VBSS) team conducted multiple training exercises, supported maritime interdiction operations, and completed rescue and assistance boardings of two vessels in distress.  After Farragut departed the 5th Fleet, she made her final port visit to Bar, Montenegro.  While in Bar, four "E's" were painted on the bridge wings to signify Farraguts selection for the 2012 Battle Efficiency Award and three Command Excellence Awards.  These awards recognized the hard work and dedication displayed by Farraguts crew during the past year.

Farragut left Mayport on 6 August 2022 for a deployment with the  Carrier Strike Group.

Engagements
On 21 February 2010, a SH-60B Seahawk helicopter from Farragut disrupted two attempts by Somali pirates to attack the Tanzanian vessel MV Barakaale 1. The helicopter then stopped the pirate skiff as it attempted to speed away, by firing warning shots across its bow. A Visit, Board, Search and Seizure (VBSS) team from Farragut boarded the vessel and the eight suspected pirates were taken aboard Farragut.

For the majority of her 2010 deployment the CENTCOM AOR, Farragut served as flagship of Combined Task Force 151 (CTF-151), on an anti-piracy mission. On 1 April 2010, three suspected pirate boats fired on a Sierra Leone flagged tanker, MV Evita, north-west of Seychelles. Evita was fired on, but managed to escape, in part by crew firing flares at their attackers.  They reported the attack to CTF-151, and Farragut responded.  After boarding the pirate skiffs, and moving the pirates to the smaller, less capable skiffs, Farragut destroyed the pirate "mother" skiff.

On 29 January 2013 Yemeni authorities working alongside Farragut intercepted a ship in the Arabian Sea carrying an illegal-arms cache. The cache included surface-to-air missiles, C-4 explosives, rocket propelled grenades and other weapons.

On 14 January 2020, the Farragut and a Russian warship nearly collided with one another in the North Arabian Sea.

Awards
 Navy Meritorious Unit Commendation - (Apr-Oct 2008, Oct 2011-Jul 2013, Apr-Dec 2018)
 Battle "E" - (2008, 2012, 2016, 2017)
 Retention Excellence award - (2018)

References

External links

  USS Farragut official website 
  USS Farragut at NavSource.org

 

Arleigh Burke-class destroyers
Destroyers of the United States
Ships built in Bath, Maine
2005 ships